Millat Tractors is a Pakistani agricultural machinery manufacturer based in Lahore, Punjab, Pakistan. Founded in 1964, it is the manufacturer of Massey Ferguson tractors in Pakistan with a production capacity of 40,000.

It is one of the two major tractor manufacturers of Pakistan with a 70 percent market share, as compared to Al-Ghazi Tractors which had 29 percent market share in 2021.

History
Millat Tractors was founded as Rana Tractors and Equipment Limited in Lahore to import and market Massey Ferguson tractors in 1964.

In 1965, facilities were created in Karachi to assemble tractors from semi-knocked-down kits. In 1967, operations were shifted from Karachi to Lahore. 

In 1972, under the Zulfiqar Ali Bhutto, the company was nationalized and started assembling and marketing tractors on behalf of the Pakistan Tractor Corporation (PTC).

In 1980, the Government decided on indigenization of the tractors and Pakistan Tractor Corporation transferred this role of indigenization to Millat Tractors Limited. In just one year, the company took a giant step towards self-sufficiency by setting up the first engine assembly plant in Pakistan. 

In 1984, sophisticated manufacturing facilities for the machining of intricate components were set up. These were previously not available in Pakistan. Currently, critical components like the engine block, sump, transmission case, axle housing, hydraulic lift cover, front axle support and center housing are all being machined successfully in-house, with 95 percent localization, at Millat Tractors from locally sourced castings.

In 1992, the company was privatized, and Millat Tractors plant started its in-house production. The establishment of this modern plant not only increased production capacity to 16,000 tractors per year on a single-shift basis. 

In the 2009-2010 financial year, production shot up to 42,000 tractors, the highest sales of tractors ever in Pakistan for any company at the time.

During the fiscal year 2017-18, Millat Tractors Limited produced and sold over 42,500 tractors.

International brand tractors
Occasionally one can spot Belarus (tractor), John Deere Tractor and some other international brands in the agricultural fields of Pakistan but they only have 4% of the overall market share, as of 2018, in tractors for Pakistan. Also these well-known international brand tractors are imported as either completely built-up units (CBU) or semi knocked-down (SKD) units and are not assembled on large scale in Pakistan.

Pakistan has low labor costs. This is why Pakistan makes one of the lowest priced tractors in the world. As of 2018, a 55hp tractor costs about $7,000 in Pakistan, whereas it costs about $20,000 in Turkey, $25,000 in Europe and $30,000 in the United States. These low costs give Pakistan some advantage in the international markets and some Pakistani tractors are exported to Afghanistan and many African countries.

Another boost to tractor production came from China-Pakistan Economic Corridor (CPEC) which needs and uses a large number of tractors in its construction projects.

Products
 Agricultural Tractors
 Diesel Engines
 Diesel Generating Sets and Prime Movers
 Forklift Trucks, under license from Anhui Heli Forklift Trucks China
 A wide range of Agricultural implements

Forbes list
Millat Tractors, as a company, is on the Forbes List of Asia's 200 Best Under a Billion (2018)

References

External links
 Company website

Tractor manufacturers of Pakistan
Pakistani brands
Manufacturing companies based in Lahore
Pakistani companies established in 1964
Vehicle manufacturing companies established in 1964
Companies listed on the Pakistan Stock Exchange